Schwarzhausen is a village in Thuringia, Germany. In 1946, it was incorporated into the municipality of Emsetal in the district of Gotha.

Geography 
Schwarzhausen is located on the northeast edge of the Thuringian Forest at an altitude of about 320 to 360 meters in the Emse valley.

References in literature 
Schwarzhausen was a major place setting for the early plot in Moderne Deutsche Sprachlehre, an English-German language book.

Sources
Horst H. Müller: Reisehandbuch Thüringer Wald und Randgebiete (1977) S. 635 f.

Villages in Thuringia